The Red Deer Rebels are a Western Hockey League junior ice hockey team based in Red Deer, Alberta, Canada. The Rebels play at the Peavey Mart Centrium.

History 

A "Name the Team" contest ran in Red Deer from October 7 to 17, 1991. The top three ideas from the over 1000 entries were "Rebels", "Renegades", and "Centurions". Team management chose the name "Rebels". On February 5, 1992, the Rebels selected Mike McBain as their first player in the Bantam Draft. The Rebels' first game was on September 25, 1992, in Red Deer against the Prince Albert Raiders (the Rebels won 6 to 3 in front of 5,240 fans). The original owner of the team was Terry Simpson, the original General Manager was Wayne Simpson and the original Coach was Peter Anholt. The Rebels had their first sell-out game at the Centrium on January 9, 1993, with 6,476 in attendance.

Goalie Jason Clague was credited with a goal on March 28, 1994 during a playoff game against the Lethbridge Hurricanes. David Hruska scored 5 goals in one game on October 20, 1995, in a game against the Medicine Hat Tigers. BJ Young set a team record for fastest goal at the start of a game at 0:06 of the first period on December 6, 1995, against the Medicine Hat Tigers. On May 11, 1999, Brent Sutter purchased the team from Terry and Wayne Simpson.

The Rebels were successful in the early 2000s winning three consecutive division and conference titles between 2000–01 and 2002–03. This period began with a WHL and Memorial Cup championship in 2001, when Jeff Smith scored the overtime winner against the Val-d'Or Foreurs. The Rebels were unable to duplicate this feat, falling in the league championship series the next two seasons.

President and owner Brent Sutter was also highly successful while serving as Team Canada's coach at both the 2005 and 2006 World Junior Hockey Championships. His older brother, Brian, took over the reins of the team for the 2007–08 season. Brent Sutter was named as the new head coach on November 14, 2012.

The Rebels had the first overall pick in the 2008 WHL Bantam Draft, choosing Burnaby, British Columbia native Ryan Nugent-Hopkins, who was also selected number one overall at the 2011 NHL Entry Draft. Other notable first round draft picks include Cam Ward, Dion Phaneuf, Mathew Dumba and Jesse Wallin.

The Rebels were the host team of the 2016 Memorial Cup tournament. 

In 2022, the team had broken a WHL record as the longest winning streak at the beginning of their season opening with 15 wins.

Championships
Division titles won: 2000–01, 2001–02, 2002–03, 2010–11
Regular season titles won: 2000–01, 2001–02
League Championships won: 2001
Memorial Cup Titles: 2001

WHL finals
2000–01: Win, 4–1 vs Portland
2001–02: Loss, 2–4 vs Kootenay
2002–03: Loss, 2–4 vs Kelowna

Season-by-season record
Legend: GP = Games played, W = Wins, L = Losses, T = Ties OTL = Overtime losses Pts = Points, GF = Goals for, GA = Goals against

Team captains

 1992–1993, Todd Johnson
 1993–1994, Ken Richardson
 1994–1995, Peter Leboutillier
 1995–1996, Terry Lindgren
 1996–1998, Jesse Wallin
 1998–1999, Brad Leeb
 1999–2001, Jim Vandermeer
 2001–2002, Colby Armstrong
 2004–2005, Colin Fraser
 2006–2007, Brett Sutter
 2007–2008, Brandon Sutter
 2009–2010, Colin Archer
 2010–2011, Colin Archer
 2011–2012, Turner Elison
 2013–2014, Conner Bleackley
 2014–2015, Luke Philp
 2014–2016, Wyatt Johnson
 2016–2017, Adam Musil
 2017–2018, Grayson Pawlenchuk
 2018–2019, Reese Johnson
 2019–2020, Dawson Barteaux
 2020, Ethan Sakowich

Current roster 
Updated March 3, 2023.

 

  
  

 

 

  

 

 
 
  

 

|}

NHL alumni

Colby Armstrong
Arron Asham
Ryan Bonni
Mike Brown
Jake DeBrusk
Mathew Dumba
Matt Ellison
Turner Elson
Martin Erat
Landon Ferraro
Haydn Fleury
Colin Fraser
Matt Fraser
Byron Froese
Michael Garnett
Carsen Germyn
Boyd Gordon
Brandon Hagel
Martin Hanzal
Jay Henderson
Reese Johnson
Blair Jones
Matt Keith
Darcy Kuemper
Peter Leboutillier
Brad Leeb
Brian Loney
Ross Lupaschuk
Doug Lynch
Steve MacIntyre
Justin Mapletoft
Masi Marjamaki
Mike McBain
Derek Meech
Vladimir Mihalik
Nelson Nogier
Ryan Nugent-Hopkins
Stephen Peat
John Persson
Alex Petrovic
Dion Phaneuf
Craig Reichert
James Reimer
Terry Ryan
Robert Schnabel
Sean Selmser
Shay Stephenson
Brandon Sutter
Brett Sutter
Jim Vandermeer
Pete Vandermeer
Darren Van Impe
Kris Versteeg
Jesse Wallin
Kyle Wanvig
Cam Ward
Lance Ward
Jaxsen Wiebe
Roman Wick
Jeff Woywitka
Mikhail Yakubov
B. J. Young

WHL awards

AirBC Trophy (Playoff MVP award)
2001 - Shane Bendera

WHL Plus-Minus Award
2000/01 - Jim Vandermeer

St. Clair Group Trophy (Marketing/public relations award)
1996/97 - Pat Garrity
2001/02 - Greg McConkey

Doug Wickenheiser Memorial Trophy (Humanitarian of the year award)
1996/97 - Jesse Wallin
1997/98 - Jesse Wallin
2000/01 - Jim Vandermeer
2004/05 - Colin Fraser

Scotty Munro Memorial Trophy (Regular season champion)
2000/01 - Red Deer Rebels
2001/02 - Red Deer Rebels

Lloyd Saunders Memorial Trophy (Executive of the year)
2000/01 - Brent Sutter

Dunc McCallum Memorial Trophy (Coach of the year)
2000/01 - Brent Sutter

Del Wilson Trophy (Top goaltender)
2001/02 - Cam Ward
2003/04 - Cam Ward
2010/11 - Darcy Kuemper
2012/13 - Patrik Bartosak

Jim Piggott Memorial Trophy (Rookie of the year)
2002/03 - Matt Ellison
2009/10 - Ryan Nugent-Hopkins
2010/11 - Mathew Dumba

Bill Hunter Trophy (Top defenceman)
2002/03 - Jeff Woywitka
2003/04 - Dion Phaneuf
2004/05 - Dion Phaneuf
2011/12 - Alex Petrovic

Brad Hornung Trophy (Most sportsmanlike player)
2002/03 - Boyd Gordon

Bob Clarke Trophy (Top scorer)
2000/01 - Justin Mapletoft
2021/22 - Arshdeep Bains

Four Broncos Memorial Trophy (Player of the year)
2000/01 - Justin Mapletoft
2003/04 - Cam Ward
2010/11 - Darcy Kuemper

CHL awards

CHL Humanitarian of the Year
1996/97 - Jesse Wallin
2000/01 - Jim Vandermeer
2004/05 - Colin Fraser

CHL Goaltender of the Year
2003/04 - Cam Ward
2010/11 - Darcy Kuemper
2012/13 - Patrik Bartosak

CHL Rookie of the Year
2002/03 - Matt Ellison

CHL Top Draft Prospect Award
2010/11 - Ryan Nugent-Hopkins

Brian Kilrea Coach of the Year Award
2000/01 - Brent Sutter

Stafford Smythe Memorial Trophy Memorial Cup MVP
2001 - Kyle Wanvig

Memorial Cup
2000/01 - Red Deer Rebels

See also
 List of ice hockey teams in Alberta

References

External links
Official web site

Ice hockey teams in Alberta
Sport in Red Deer, Alberta
Ice hockey clubs established in 1992
Western Hockey League teams
1992 establishments in Alberta